John Mizuno is a Democratic politician who has served in the Hawaii House of Representatives since 2006.  Mizuno was Vice Speaker of the House from 2013 to 2017, and was re-elected Vice Speaker on 20 January 2021.  John Mizuno is the first Hawaii lawmaker to ever be recognized as the Legislator of the Year as a freshman. In 2007 Mizuno was recognized as the Legislator of the Year by the Coalition for a Tobacco Free Hawaii. Mizuno was recognized as Legislator of the Year in 2009 by the Hawaii Psychological Association and in 2010 Mizuno was awarded the Legislator of the Year title by the United States Humane Society. He served as a House Majority Whip from 2011 until 2013. In 2017 Representative John Mizuno became the Chairman of the newly formed super committee of Health and Human Services. This was the first time in the history of the House of Representatives that the Health Committee has ever been combined with the Human Services Committee. Mizuno is the former chair of the Human Services Committee (2009-2012). Prior to winning elective office, Mizuno was an administrative hearings officer for the Department of Human Services in Hawaii (1992-1998), a special investigator for the Department of Human Services in Hawaii (1998-2003), and a legislative staff member for the House of Representatives (2003-2006). He is a graduate of the University of Hawaiʻi at Mānoa and Willamette University College of Law.

References

|-

1964 births
Living people
21st-century American politicians
Democratic Party members of the Hawaii House of Representatives
Hawaii politicians of Japanese descent
University of Hawaiʻi at Mānoa alumni
Willamette University College of Law alumni